Óscar Larios (born 1 November 1976) is a Mexican former professional boxer who competed from 1994 to 2009. He is a world champion in two weight classes, having held the WBC super bantamweight title from 2002 to 2004 and the WBC featherweight title from 2008 to 2009.

Professional career

Promoted by Oscar De La Hoya, Larios began his career at 17 and dropped early losses to Israel Vázquez by KO in the 1st round and Agapito Sánchez by TKO in the 5th prior to hitting his stride as he accumulated a record of 39-2 before his first world title.

WBC Super Bantamweight Championship
In 2001, Larios challenged undefeated WBC Super Bantamweight title holder Willie Jorrín and lost a disputed 12-round decision.  Due to Jorrin's lack of activity, Larios fought Vázquez for the interim WBC Super Bantamweight Title and his earlier loss to Vázquez by scoring a TKO in the 12th round.  Several months later, Larios again took on Jorrin and avenged the earlier defeat by defeating Jorrin by TKO in the 1st round.

Larios went on to defend his title 7 times (along with 3 non-title fights), including a victory over Nedal Hussein and two wins over fan favorite Wayne McCullough. He then took on Vázquez yet again but was dominated this time, dropping the trilogy capper by KO 3 and thus losing his title.  In July 2006, Larios moved up to Super Featherweight to take on then three-division world champion Manny Pacquiao, a Filipino boxer highly capable of besting opponents by KO. Larios fought bravely, but was dominated by the bigger Pacquiao and was dropped twice en route to losing a 12-round decision.

Move to Featherweight

Interim WBC Featherweight Championship
On July 21, 2007, Jorge Linares of Venezuela defeated him by KO in the 10th round for the WBC Interim featherweight title in Las Vegas, Nevada, Nevada.  After the fight with Linares, Larios was diagnosed with a minor subdural hematoma, bleeding of the brain, putting any hopes of a future boxing career in jeopardy. Larios eventually returned to boxing, but remains under medical suspension throughout the United States.

Later on February 22, 2008, Larios won his latest match by unanimous decision against Arturo Gomez.

In May 2008, Larios defeated Feider Viloria via fifth-round TKO for the vacant Interim WBC Featherweight title, commissioned when reigning titlist Jorge Linares was unavailable to fight Viloria due to injury. On August 2, 2008, in Zapopan, Jalisco, Larios made his first defense of the WBC interim featherweight title, defeating Marlon Aguilar by seventh-round knockout. The bout was competitive for several rounds, but Larious took command of the fight, knocking Aguilar down at the end of the sixth round and knocking him out in the seventh round.

WBC Featherweight Championship
Larios inherited the full-pledge WBC featherweight title when Linares relinquished it to move up in weight.

He won his first defense of his title with a split decision win over Takahiro Ao on October 16, 2008. Despite being floored in the 4th round, Larios managed to outbox the Japanese challenger for the victory.

The two fighters met again on March 12, 2009. Like in the previous encounter, the matches resulted in a decision. But this time, it was in Aoh's favor.

Professional boxing record

Pay-per-view bouts

See also
List of super-bantamweight boxing champions
List of featherweight boxing champions
List of Mexican boxing world champions

References

External links

 

    

1976 births
Living people
Super-bantamweight boxers
Featherweight boxers
World super-bantamweight boxing champions
World featherweight boxing champions
World Boxing Council champions
People from Zapopan, Jalisco
Boxers from Jalisco
Mexican male boxers
People with traumatic brain injuries